In 't Veld is a Dutch toponymic surname meaning "in the field". Variations are In 't Veldt, In het Veld and the contraction Intveld. More common Dutch surnames with a similar meaning are Van de Velde, Van der Velde and Van der Velden ("from the fields"). Notable people with the name include:

 André in het Veld (born 1958), Dutch former freestyle swimmer
 Bart Spring in 't Veld (born 1976), Dutch television producer
 James Intveld (born 1959), Dutch-born American rockabilly singer-songwriter
 Jan in 't Veld (1925–2005), Dutch aerospace engineer and professor of industrial organization
 Joris in 't Veld (1885–1981), Dutch Social Democratic politician, minister, professor at the Leiden University
 Roel in 't Veld (born 1942), Dutch public administration scholar and Labour Party politician
 Sophie in 't Veld (born 1963), Dutch Member of the European Parliament

References

Dutch-language surnames
Dutch toponymic surnames